The 1976–77 Bulgarian Cup was the 37th season of the Bulgarian Cup (in this period the tournament was named Cup of the Soviet Army). Levski Sofia won the competition, beating Lokomotiv Sofia 2–1 in the final at the Vasil Levski National Stadium.

First round

|-
!colspan=3 style="background-color:#D0F0C0;" |15 December 1976

|}

Second round

|-
!colspan=3 style="background-color:#D0F0C0;" |18 December 1976

|}

Third round

Quarter-finals

Semi-finals

Final

Details

References

1976-77
1976–77 domestic association football cups
Cup

bg:Купа на Съветската армия 1976/77